Mangled After Dinner was an English gothic rock band founded in 1981 in Manchester, England. Mangled After Dinner reached a small but loyal community of fans and played an overly gloomy sound, using synthesizer effects and well-written lyrics of exceptionally romantic poetry. Their major themes included: rainstorms, dark forests, abandoned castles, English folklore and the pursuit of answers through solitude and disbelievement.

Members
The band was formed by:
 Trevor "Poeraver" Chadwick - vocals (1959–1989)
 Henry Lansford - guitar (born 1961)
 Frederick "Fred" Ritchen - bass (born 1961)
 John "Johnny" Lansford - drums (born 1957)

Their first success was Mangled After Dinner Ritual, recorded in long play with eight total tracks and a stylized black cover with a designed skull with a lit candle abovehead. The band disbanded in the late 1980s, when Chadwick died in a car crash near London in October 1989.

Discography
 Mangled After Dinner Ritual (1981)
 The Symphony of the Mangled One (1983)
 Darkened Club Symphony (1984)
 Hits from the Grave - M.A.D. Collection (1986)
 The Hanging Man (1988)

Bootlegs
 Voices Far Beyond (1991), collection of recorded but never released demo, outtakes and general discarded musics. Rough sound with lo-fi recording.
 Tribute to Chadwick (1993), lo-fi recording in a very rare album where lesser known bands plays six tracks of the MAD official discography. Back cover depicts the band, in a photo taken in one of their live shows.

References

English gothic rock groups